Dancing with the Stars is an American reality television show in which celebrity contestants and professional dance partners compete to be the best dancers, as determined by the show's judges and public voting. The series first broadcast in 2005, and thirty-one complete seasons have aired. During each season, competitors are progressively eliminated on the basis of public voting and scores received from the judges until only a few contestants remain. These finalists participate in a finale, from which a winner is determined. Celebrities appearing on Dancing with the Stars include "actors, singers, comedians, musicians, entrepreneurs, athletes, reality stars, journalists, TV presenters, internet personalities, newsmakers, and where-are-they-now personalities".

As of season 31, 367 celebrities have competed. Eleven of those withdrew from the competition: Sara Evans of season three left the show to "give her family full attention" after filing for divorce; Misty May-Treanor of season seven was forced to pull out after an ankle injury; Tom DeLay of season nine reportedly withdrew "due to stress fractures in both of his feet"; Dorothy Hamill of season sixteen withdrew due to a previous injury that was unrelated to the competition; Billy Dee Williams of season eighteen quit due to a back injury; Kim Zolciak-Biermann of season twenty-one was forced to withdraw after suffering a mini-stroke, which although cleared her to dance, prevented her from flying to California from Atlanta; Tamar Braxton, also of season twenty-one, withdrew due to pulmonary embolisms in her lungs; Christie Brinkley of season twenty-eight withdrew on the day of the season premiere due to an injury to her arm that required surgery; she was replaced by her daughter Sailor; Ray Lewis, also of season twenty-eight, withdrew due to a toe injury sustained during rehearsals; Jeannie Mai of season twenty-nine withdrew due to being hospitalized for epiglottitis; and Selma Blair of season thirty-one withdrew when it became too risky to continue dancing due to her multiple sclerosis. 

At age 14, actress Willow Shields of season twenty was the youngest contestant to compete on the show (not counting Dancing with the Stars: Juniors). At age 82, actress Cloris Leachman of season seven was the oldest contestant to compete on the show. At age 51, singer Donny Osmond of season nine was the oldest contestant to win the competition. At age 16 years, Laurie Hernandez of season twenty-three was the youngest contestant to win. 

Forty-nine  professional dancers have partnered with the celebrities. The thirty-one winners of the show, in chronological order, are Kelly Monaco, Drew Lachey, Emmitt Smith, Apolo Anton Ohno, Hélio Castroneves, Kristi Yamaguchi, Brooke Burke, Shawn Johnson, Donny Osmond, Nicole Scherzinger, Jennifer Grey, Hines Ward, J.R. Martinez, Donald Driver, Melissa Rycroft, Kellie Pickler, Amber Riley, Meryl Davis, Alfonso Ribeiro, Rumer Willis, Bindi Irwin, Nyle DiMarco, Laurie Hernandez, Rashad Jennings, Jordan Fisher, Adam Rippon, Bobby Bones, Hannah Brown, Kaitlyn Bristowe, Iman Shumpert and Charli D'Amelio. Pro skateboarder, Sky Brown was the junior champion. The nineteen professional partners who have won, in chronological order by first win, are Alec Mazo, Cheryl Burke (twice), Julianne Hough (twice), Mark Ballas (three times), Derek Hough (six times), Kym Johnson (twice), Karina Smirnoff, Peta Murgatroyd (twice), Tony Dovolani, Maksim Chmerkovskiy, Witney Carson, Valentin Chmerkovskiy (twice), Emma Slater, Lindsay Arnold, Jenna Johnson, Sharna Burgess, Alan Bersten, Artem Chigvintsev and Daniella Karagach. J.T. Church was the junior professional champion.

Competitors
In the following list, the winner of each season is shown in gold, second place in silver and third place in bronze.

Notes

References

 
 

Dancing with the Stars (U.S.) competitors
Lists of reality show participants
Competitors